The Man from the Clouds is a 1918 spy thriller novel by J. Storer Clouston. Like his better-known The Spy in Black it takes place during the First World War.

Synopsis
Roger Merton, a pilot in the Royal Navy crash lands on an island off the Scottish coast. Discovering it has been taken over by German agents, he decides to pretend to be on their side in order to infiltrate them and find out exactly what is being planned.

References

Bibliography
 Burton, Alan. Historical Dictionary of British Spy Fiction. Rowman & Littlefield, 2016.
 Royle, Trevor. Macmillan Companion to Scottish Literature. Macmillan, 1984.

1918 British novels
British war novels
British spy novels
Novels set during World War I
British thriller novels
Novels by J. Storer Clouston
William Blackwood books
Novels set in Scotland